The Taipei Dome also known as the Farglory Dome, is a multi-purpose domed stadium under construction located in Xinyi, Taipei, Taiwan, that was originally scheduled to start construction in 2007 and be completed in 2011, although the start date had been delayed until October 2011. In addition to the stadium, there will be a complex that will include commercial facilities such as a shopping mall, movie theater, hotel, and office space. Once completed, the stadium should be used mostly for baseball games, but it will also be used for other sporting events such as football and softball, competitive gaming. It will be located at the corner of Zhongxiao East Rd. and Guangfu South Rd. Additionally, it was previously planned to be the main stadium of 2017 Taipei Summer Universiade. In May 2015, the Taipei City Government ordered a suspension of construction.

Overview
In June 2010, the Taipei City Government rejected a plan for a major expansion of the Taipei Dome stadium project. The plan, which would have added more stores, a movie theater complex, and a hotel, were denied due to traffic concerns in the area. On December 9, 2010, the design for the dome passed the city's urban design review. The proposed design includes a 40,000-seat indoor stadium along with shopping and residential districts. The dome is being built through a contract between the city government and the Farglory Group. Construction was tentatively planned to start in July 2011. By March 2011, however, the environmental assessment review process was delayed until April 2011. The assessment was postponed again in late March 2011 due to insufficient information from the contractor. On June 16, 2011, the project received final approval from the Urban Design Review Committee and construction started in October 2011.

Transportation
Taipei Dome will be accessible within walking distance North from Sun Yat-sen Memorial Hall Station of the Taipei Metro.

References

External links 
 

Baseball venues in Taiwan
Football venues in Taiwan
Proposed stadiums
Sports venues in Taipei
Stadiums under construction
Proposed buildings and structures in Taiwan
Postmodern architecture in Taiwan
Futurist architecture